Zhenlai County is a county in northwestern Jilin province, China, occupying the northernmost part of the province and bordering Heilongjiang to the east and Inner Mongolia to the west.

Administrative divisions
There are seven towns, two townships, and two ethnic township.

Climate

References

External links

County-level divisions of Jilin